The Rath (Rajasthani: रथ (Devanagari)  (Perso-Arabic)) are a  community, found in the state of Rajasthan in India. They also settled in Punjab and Sindh provinces Pakistan. There is another clan similar to it known as Rathi.

Background

Etymology

The Rath are said to get their name from the Rathi breed of cattle, which they used to and still herd.

History 

Historically, the Rath were a community of pastoral nomads, breeding mainly cows and sheep, as well as cultivating dry crops, and migrating three to nine months of the year. Till about the 1950s, no recognized rights to the land existed. This was in marked contrast to the related Pachhada community, who were found in Hissar and Mahendargarh districts of Haryana, who was forced to settle down by the British authorities in the late 19th century. With the construction of the Indira Gandhi Canal, land was divided up, and a large number granted to settlers. This led to a drastic reduction in the grazing area, and process that has led to the abandoning of the nomadic lifestyle. The community are now only partially nomadic, with some members taking the cattle and sheep to their grazing areas, while the majority remaining in the village.

According to the traditions of the Parhar Rath, they were originally Parihar Rajputs of Mandore, who were defeated by the Rathores, and fled to Sindh. During their period of exile, the Parhar were converted to Islam. The community than moved to the desert regions of Bikaner State, and spread over time to the Cholistan desert region. While the Bohar and Johiya Rath both claim descent from the Bhatti Rajputs, and have different traditions as to their conversion to Islam.  As a community, they have a strong self-identification as being a Rajput community. They are culturally close to tribesmen of the Cholistan region of Punjab, Pakistan, who are also largely Rath.

Culture

Biradari panchayat and social customs 

Like other North India communities, they have a council of elders which settles intra-community disputes, and punishes the guilty. Each lineage has an informal caste council, known as a biradari panchayat. This acts as an instrument of social control by punishing those who breach community norms such as marrying out of the community etc. The Rath are Sunni Muslims, but incorporate many folk beliefs.

Languages 

Rathi language is a distinct dialect, with mixture of Haryanvi, Punjabi, and Bagri spoken in  Haryana state  of India.

Elsewhere, the Rath speak Seraiki among themselves, and Marwari with others. They are also closely related to the Pachhadas, a community once found in Hissar and Mahendragarh districts of Haryana, but now found in Punjab in Pakistan.

Demography

Sub-groups of Rath 

Rath tribes are divided into three major sub-groups, the Parihar or sometimes referred to as Parhar Rath, the Joyia or and the Bohar, and a number of minor lineages, such as the Chanar, Larr, Chhachhar and Chandani.

The Parhar Rath community is further divided into a number of clans, known as gotras. Their main clans include the Parihar, Kotowar, Daiya, Seikh, Lad and Koria. The various gotras observe a set pattern with regards to marriage. For example, the Parihar and Kotowar receive girls from the Koria, while the Daiya and Parihar give girls to the Kotowar and Seikh. Other Rath communities include the Bohar and Johiya tribal groupings, found mainly in the Bikaner, Ganganagar and the neighbouring region of Cholistan of Pakistan. Marriages tend to take place within the three sub-divisions, but marriages are forbidden within the gotra.

Geographical spread 

The Rath are found mainly in Barmer, Bikaner, Ganganagar and Jaisalmer districts. They are still essentially a community of pastoralists. Agriculture is the other main pursuit of this community.  For six months of the year, from May to October, they cultivate their fields, and for the other six months, they herd their cattle. Their villages are found in the Thar Desert region, and most of their villages are without electricity.

See also
Rath Wor is Ror itself. Road (Road) is also its spelling R.O.D. In old documents, R was called L. This history is not understood intentionally or unintentionally. Rath is a Ror dynasty that ruled Sindh and Punjab. Sindh is much smaller than the earlier Sindh and this Rath caste is the Ror dynasty, later it separated from the lineage to other castes such that some became Rathi, some became Rahar, some Roth went to forest and some became Rathod. It tells that I am saying that the birth of Rath or Rath has been told from the Jat caste but it is born from the Ror dynasty. h  Many writers steal the history of the Ror dynasty and make it a Jat caste and keep the history of the Ror dynasty from place to place. Deravar This Ravar or Rawad is related to the Ror dynasty, in Rajasthan this dynasty is made up of Ra + Va + Ra, D, in this article and in other articles also there is a large number of Ra, Kol, Ya d, ko sr to rw rd to sr too is the correct pronunciation please pay attention to it  
 Cholistan
 Johiya

References

Social groups of Pakistan
Social groups of Punjab, Pakistan
Saraiki tribes
Punjabi tribes
Muslim communities of India
Social groups of Rajasthan
Muslim communities of Rajasthan